Shamsir (also Romanized as Shamsīr) is a village in Arshaq-e Gharbi Rural District, Moradlu District, Meshgin Shahr County, Ardabil Province, Iran. At the 2006 census, its population was 255, in 53 families.

References 

Tageo

Towns and villages in Meshgin Shahr County